Albany Records is a record label that concentrates on unconventional contemporary classical music by American composers and musicians. It was established by Peter Kermani in 1987 and is based in Albany, New York.

See also
 List of record labels

References

External links
Albany Records official site

Classical music record labels
American independent record labels
Companies based in Albany, New York
Record labels established in 1987
Contemporary classical music
1987 establishments in New York (state)